Lago di Tovel is a lake in Trentino, Italy. At an elevation of 1178 m, its surface area is 0.38 km².
The lake has been recognised as a wetland of international importance under the Ramsar Convention in 1980.

References 

Ramsar sites in Italy
Lakes of Trentino-Alto Adige/Südtirol